Ian Coke is a Bermudaian footballer currently playing for the Dandy Town Hornets of the Bermudian Premier Division and the Bermuda national team.

Club career
Coke has played for Hamilton Parish. He has also played for the Devonshire Colts. He won the Young Player of the Year Award for the Bermudian First Division with the club in 2012. Coke transferred from Hamilton Parish to his boyhood club, Boulevard Blazers F.C., in 2014. In his first season back with the club, he scored 22 league goals and helped the club with the first division title. He was named the MVP of the Bermudian Premier Division in 2017 after scoring 15 goals for Boulevard, tied for most in the league with Angelo Simmons of Dandy Town Hornets, after missing a chunk of the season to injury.

Coke has also played in the Island Soccer League and was selected as a member of the league's all-star team which competed against a representative team from the Major Indoor Soccer League in 2011. Coke scored a goal in the eventual 3–9 defeat.

In June 2017 Coke signed for fellow Bermudian club  Dandy Town Hornets.

International career
Coke was part of Bermuda's squad for 2009 CONCACAF U-20 Championship qualifying. He scored in a 2–0 victory over Puerto Rico in the group stage. Coke made his senior international debut on 7 September 2012 in a 2012 Caribbean Cup qualification match against Puerto Rico. His scored his first international goal four days later in a match against Saint Martin in the same competition. Coke had often found himself down the pecking order behind European-based players Nahki Wells, Rai Simons, and Jonte Smith.

International goals
Score and result list Bermuda's goal tally first.

References

External links
 Caribbean Football Database profile
 
 

Living people
People from Hamilton Parish
Association football forwards
Bermudian footballers
Bermuda international footballers
Year of birth missing (living people)